Baiyappanahalli metro station at Baiyyappanahalli is the eastern terminal point on the east–west corridor of the Namma Metro in Bangalore, India.

Station layout 

**Currently Platforms 1 and 2 are under maintenance due to Purple Line extension towards Whitefield**

Entry/Exits
There are 3 Entry/Exit points – A, B and C. Commuters can use either of the points for their travel.

 Entry/Exit point A: Towards Old Madras Road or towards Tin Factory side
 Entry/Exit point B: Towards Baiyappanahalli Railway Stn.
 Entry/Exit point C: Towards Ramamurthy Nagar side and towards this metro parking

Facilities
BMRCL has constructed a skywalk from the Baiyappanahalli station to BMRCL's traffic integration area on the NGEF side (Kasturinagar). The commissioner of metro railway safety (Southern Circle) had given permission to construct the skywalk.

Initially, there were no toilets at Namma Metro stations, despite demand from commuters. The metro's first toilets were opened at Baiyappanahalli and Indiranagar stations on 21 June 2013.

Parking
Baiyappanahalli station has a 2600m2 asphalted parking area. It is being operated by Central Parking Services, under contract, until 2015. The parking lot can accommodate 100 four-wheel and 150 two-wheel vehicles. It was the first Namma Metro station to offer parking facilities.

Connections
Metro station is connected with Baiyyappanahali railway station of Indian Railways network.

See also
Baiyyappanahalli
Bangalore
Baiyyappanahali railway station
List of Namma Metro stations
Transport in Karnataka
List of metro systems
List of rapid transit systems in India
Bangalore Metropolitan Transport Corporation

References

External links

 Bangalore Metro Rail Corporation Ltd. (Official site) 
 UrbanRail.Net – descriptions of all metro systems in the world, each with a schematic map showing all stations.

Namma Metro stations
Railway stations in India opened in 2011
2011 establishments in Karnataka